Varavelpu is a 1989 Indian Malayalam-language black comedy film directed by Sathyan Anthikad and written by Sreenivasan, starring Mohanlal, Revathi, Sreenivasan, Thilakan, Murali, Innocent, and Jagadish. The film was produced by K. Rajagopal. The film depicted trade union problems plaguing Kerala in a satirical dark comedy.

The film was based on a real-life incident in Sreenivasan's father's life. The film was an average grosser at box office but later created a cult status and following. The movie was remade in Hindi as Chal Chala Chal.

Plot
Murali returns to his home town after spending 7 long years hardworking in gulf with an intention to settle down peacefully in his hometown. Much against the greedy wishes of his family members, he decides to buy a second hand bus that comes along with a route permit. This is when he faces a lot of hardships. Starting from an accident because of the inefficient driver, a  cheating conductor,  to a cunning union leader, Murali's life is taken for a toss with ever growing challenges one after the other. Then he gets an offer from a labour officer but he turns down saying that he has already lost this game and he tends to move for a better job. At last it is depicted as he leaves to Bombay.

Cast

Mohanlal as Murali
Revathi as Rema
Sreenivasan as a vehicle inspector 
Murali as Prabhakaran
Jagadish as Valsan
Thilakan as Ramakrishnan
Innocent as Chathukutty
Janardhanan as Kumaran
Oduvil Unnikrishnan as Narayanan
Mamukkoya as Hamsa
Sankaradi as Murali's uncle
K. P. A. C. Lalitha as Santha
Meena as Rukmini
Thikkurissy Sukumaran Nair as Govindan Nair
Bobby Kottarakkara as Pappan
Krishnan Kutty Nair as Rema's father
Praseetha Menon
Sindhu Varma

Production
The film was based on a real-life incident in Sreenivasan's father's life. Sathyan Anthikkad got the story idea while listening to Sreenivasan when he recalled how his family ended in financial debt as his communist father was labeled a capitalist after he bought a bus.

Soundtrack

Reception
In 2003, the then Indian Prime Minister Atal Bihari Vajpayee mentioned the film and Mohanlal in his inaugural speech at the Global Investor Meet held in Kerala. He said: "I am told that there is a Malayalam movie called Varavelppu in which your famous actor Mohanlal acts as a Gulf-returned Keralite. He invests his savings in a small business venture with high hopes. But in the end, he is forced to close it down after going through many unpleasant experiences. Therefore, this conference should serve as an occasion for introspection".

References

External links
 

1989 films
1980s Malayalam-language films
Films with screenplays by Sreenivasan
Films directed by Sathyan Anthikad
1980s black comedy films
Films shot in Ottapalam
Films shot in Palakkad
Films shot in Thrissur
Malayalam films remade in other languages
1989 comedy films
Indian black comedy films
Films scored by Johnson
Indian business films
Malayalam film score composers